Magic Moments Motion Pictures is an Indian Bengali-language television serial and film production company based in Kolkata, incorporated on 29 June 2010. Magic Moments Motion Pictures Private Limited has 2 creative directors/key management personnel - Saibal Banerjee and Leena Gangopadhyay. They started off with shows like "Binni Dhaner Khoi" and "Keya Patar Nouko",  and went on to produce more shows on Bengali Television, including Ishti Kutum, Jol Nupur, Chokher Tara Tui, Ichche Nodee, Kusum Dola, Andarmahal, Phagun Bou, Nokshi Kantha, Sreemoyee, Mohor, Khorkuto, Dhulokona, and Ekka Dokka.

The house also produced their first Hindi Show Thoda sa Baadal Thoda sa Paani, jointly with Optimystix Entertainment for Colors TV. The production-house is coming up with their next Hindi show Kabhi Kabhie Ittefaq Sey, jointly with Cockcrow & Shaika Entertainment for channel StarPlus.

Current TV shows

Original Shows

Produced by Organinc Studios

Film productions 
Khoj (2017)
Maati (2018)
Sanjhbati (2019)
Khelaghar (2023)

TV series productions 

 Originally produced by Vandana Films and Enterprises, this show was later picked up by Magic Moments Motion Pictures
 Produced by Organinc Studios - a subsidiary of Magic Moments Motion Pictures

References

Companies based in Kolkata
Television production companies of India
Entertainment companies of India
Entertainment companies established in 2010
2010 establishments in West Bengal
Indian companies established in 2010